Siju Iluyomade is a Nigerian lawyer, speaker and activist. She is the founder of Arise Women Conference, a faith-based Non-Governmental Organization (NGO) for women empowerment and Handmaidens Women in Leadership Series.

Education 
Siju attended Queen's College and got her law degree from University of Ife (now Obafemi Awolowo University, Ile Ife).

Personal life 
She is married to Idowu Iluyomade, a senior pastor at the Redeemed Christian Church of God with 3 children.

References 

Year of birth missing (living people)
Living people
Nigerian women lawyers
21st-century Nigerian lawyers